There were two Governments of the 21st Dáil, which was elected at the 1977 general election on 16 June 1977. The 15th Government of Ireland (5 July 1977 – 11 December 1979) was led by Jack Lynch as Taoiseach, while the 16th Government of Ireland (11 December 1979 – 30 June 1981) was led by Charles Haughey. Both were single-party majority Fianna Fáil governments.

The 15th Government lasted for  days and the 16th Government lasted for  days.

15th Government of Ireland

Nomination of Taoiseach
The 21st Dáil first met on 5 July 1977. In the debate on the nomination of Taoiseach, Fianna Fáil leader Jack Lynch was proposed, and this proposal was carried with 82 votes in favour and 61 votes against. Lynch was appointed as Taoiseach by president Patrick Hillery.

Members of the Government
After his appointment as Taoiseach by the president, Jack Lynch proposed the members of the government and they were approved by the Dáil. They were appointed by the president on the same day.

Notes

Attorney General
On 5 July 1977, Anthony J. Hederman SC was appointed by the president as Attorney General on the nomination of the Taoiseach.

Parliamentary Secretaries (5 July 1977 – 1 January 1978)
On 5 July 1977, the Government appointed Parliamentary Secretaries on the nomination of the Taoiseach.

Ministers of State (1 January 1978 – 11 December 1979)
Following the enactment of the Ministers and Secretaries (Amendment) (No.2) Act 1977, the post of Parliamentary Secretary was abolished and replaced by a new post of Minister of State. A maximum of 10 Ministers of State could be appointed. On 14 December 1977, Taoiseach Jack Lynch announced that the existing Parliamentary Secretaries would be appointed as Ministers of State in their respective departments with effect from 1 January 1978, and the appointment of three TDs as additional Ministers of State who would also take office on that date.

Decisions of the government
This government approved the Nuclear Energy Board plans for a plant at Carnsore Point to go ahead. Desmond O'Malley, as Minister for Industry, Commerce and Energy, was central to this policy. Later the 16th Government, during the same Dáil, dropped these plans.

Confidence in the government
On 29 May 1979, Frank Cluskey proposed a motion of no confidence in the government, citing the "serious economic mismanagement of the country by the Government". Brian Lenihan, Minister for Fisheries and Forestry, proposed an amendment to the motion expressing "satisfaction at the Government's management of the economy". On the following day, the amendment was carried by a vote of 67 to 46.

Resignation
Shortly after the loss by Fianna Fáil of two by-elections in Cork on 7 November 1979, Jack Lynch resigned as Fianna Fáil leader. Charles Haughey won the leadership election held on 7 December 1979. Lynch resigned as Taoiseach on 11 December 1979.

16th Government of Ireland

The 16th Government was formed by Charles Haughey following the resignation of Jack Lynch.

Nomination of Taoiseach
On 11 December 1979, Haughey was proposed for the nomination of the Dáil for the position of Taoiseach, and this proposal was carried with 82 votes in favour and 62 votes against. Haughey was appointed as Taoiseach by president Patrick Hillery.

Members of the Government
After his appointment as Taoiseach by the president, Charles Haughey proposed the members of the government and they were approved by the Dáil on 12 December. They were appointed by the president on the same day.

Notes

Attorney General
On 11 December 1979, Anthony J. Hederman SC was re-appointed by the president as Attorney General on the nomination of the Taoiseach.

Ministers of State
On 12 December 1979, the Government appointed Ministers of State on the nomination of the Taoiseach.

See also
Dáil Éireann
Constitution of Ireland
Politics of the Republic of Ireland

References

1977 establishments in Ireland
1981 disestablishments in Ireland
21st Dáil
Cabinets established in 1977
Cabinets disestablished in 1981
Governments of Ireland